1st Anti-Aircraft Brigade was an Air Defence formation of the British Army, during the Second World War, and served in the Battle of France and during The Blitz. It then transferred to the Middle East, where it defended the Eighth Army's lines of communication during the final phases of the North African Campaign.

Origin
The brigade was created on 8 December 1920, at Blackdown Barracks near Aldershot in Hampshire, when its first commander, Colonel Edward Ashmore was appointed. It was initially designated 1st Air Defence Brigade, then (because of confusion with the regimental-size artillery 'brigades') 1st Anti-Aircraft Group. It formed part of Aldershot Command and had the following composition:
 1st Anti-Aircraft Brigade, Royal Garrison Artillery (RGA)
 1st, 2nd and 3rd AA Batteries
 1st Anti-Aircraft Searchlight Battalion, Royal Engineers (RA)
 Air Defence Brigade Signals, Royal Corps of Signals

The RGA was merged into the RA in 1923. In 1939, the RA adopted the designation of regiment instead of brigade for its units. The resulted in the title of brigade being solely used at the more traditional formation level. The 1st Anti-Aircraft Group then became the 1st Anti-Aircraft Brigade.

Mobilisation
On the outbreak of war on 3 September 1939, 1st AA Bde had the following composition:

 6th Anti-Aircraft Regiment, RA
 3rd, 12th and 15th AA Batteries
 1st Light Anti-Aircraft Battery, RA
 1st Anti-Aircraft Battalion, RE
 A and B Anti-Aircraft Companies (searchlights)
 1st and 2nd Anti-Aircraft Brigade Signals, RCS

Battle of France

The brigade proceeded to France with the British Expeditionary Force (BEF). The two AA regiments were each equipped with 16 obsolescent 3-inch guns and eight of the newer 3.7-inch heavy AA (HAA) guns. 54th (Argyll and Sutherland Highlanders) Light Anti-Aircraft Regiment, RA (a Territorial Army (TA) unit) joined by November 1939 (less one of its batteries). It was equipped with 12 x 40 mm Bofors Guns and 12 x Vickers 2-pounders, but left to become a Corps unit before the end of the Phoney War. In January 1940, 1st AA Battalion was transferred from the Royal Engineers to the Royal Artillery as 1st Searchlight Regiment and joined 5th Searchlight Brigade. Lieutenant-Colonel E.D. Milligan was promoted from 6th AA Regiment to command the brigade.

When the Battle of France opened on 10 May 1940, 1st AA Bde was attached to General Headquarters BEF, with the following composition:

Commander: Brigadier E.D. Milligan
 1st Anti-Aircraft Regiment, RA
1st, 2nd and 17th Batteries - swapped 1st & 2nd Batteries for 15th & 16th Batteries on 1 February 1940
 6th Anti-Aircraft Regiment, RA
3rd, 12th and 15th Batteries
 85th (Tees) Anti-Aircraft Regiment, RA – crossed to France 5 April 1940 with 24 x 3.7-inch guns
 174th (North Riding), 175th (North Riding) and 220th (County of Durham) Batteries

1st AA Brigade's role was to cover corps assembly areas and the routes used by the BEF to advance into Belgium. When the German Army broke through, forcing the BEF to begin withdrawing again, the AA batteries gave cover leap-frog fashion. Soon they were sucked into the ground battle, split into sub-units to join rearguard actions or moved back from one key point to another. The brigade commander and his staff had no radio net and could only keep in touch by motor vehicle, and all the roads were choked with refugees. When the BEF reached Dunkirk and began its evacuation, the Major-General AA, Hugh Martin, set out from De Panne by road on 28 May to make contact with the retreating AA units and organise air defences. By now, 1st AA Brigade was down to 20 out of its original 72 HAA guns. Martin ordered 11 of these to be sent to Bray beach and the remainder to be disabled. 52nd (East Lancashire) Light Anti-Aircraft Regiment, RA (TA) (154th, 155th and 156th LAA Batteries) had started the campaign attached to I Corps and had been heavily engaged during the retreat. Now it joined 1st AA Bde on the Dunkirk beaches. The AA units attempted to cover the shrinking Dunkirk 'pocket' against air attack until it was their turn to destroy their equipment and join the queues of men waiting to be taken aboard small boats back to England.

The Blitz
AA units returning from France were rapidly reinforced, re-equipped where possible, and redeployed for integration into Anti-Aircraft Command's existing defence plans for the United Kingdom. AA regiments were now designated either Heavy (HAA) or Light (LAA). 1st AA Brigade HQ and 1st HAA Regiment were sent to Crewe to reform. By November 1940 they had joined a new 11th AA Division, which took over responsibility for the West Midlands; the brigade's specific responsibility was to cover the industrial areas round Crewe and Staffordshire, and to provide LAA air defences for airfields and other Vulnerable Points. The brigade now had the following composition:
 1st HAA Rgt 
1st, 2nd, 17th HAA Btys - 1st & 2nd Batteries returned on the 20th June 1940
 106th HAA Rgt – new regiment raised in August 1940, later joined Allied Force Headquarters (AFHQ) in North Africa
 327, 331, 332, 408 HAA Btys
 45th LAA Rgt – new regiment raised in July 1940, later joined AFHQ November 1942
 102, 135, 142 LAA Btys
 63rd LAA Rgt – new regiment raised in October 1940, later joined AFHQ November 1942
188, 189, 190 LAA Btys
 61st (South Lancashire) S/L Rgt – converted from 5th Battalion South Lancashire Regiment August 1940, later became 61st Garrison Regiment, Royal Artillery
432nd, 433rd and 434th S/L Btys
 78th S/L Rgt – new regiment raised in August 1940, disbanded September 1943
 498, 499, 500, 551 S/L Bty
 83rd S/L Rgt – new regiment raised January 1941 at Crewe, disbanded December 1944
 513, 514, 515 S/L Btys

At this time The Blitz was in full swing, with frequent night air raids on the industrial cities. The role of the S/L units was to track and illuminate raiders for the HAA guns of the Gun Defence Areas (GDAs) and for the few available Royal Air Force Night fighters. New tactics included grouping the S/Ls in clusters, and later in 'killer belts' for the fighters and 'indicator belts' for the guns as the raiders approached the GDAs. In April and May 1941, Merseyside and the North Midlands were particularly badly bombed (the Liverpool Blitz).

Although operating within AA Command during the Blitz, 1st AA Bde HQ together with 1st HAA Rgt remained part of the War Office Reserve, available for service in the field. By mid-May 1941 it had handed over its units and responsibilities to a new 68th AA Bde and left AA Command.

North Africa
1st AA Brigade HQ left the UK by October 1941, and by the end of the year was in the Middle East. In January 1942 the brigade took over responsibility for the GDAs in Palestine under the command of Ninth Army. It was relieved in  August 1942, and moved to Egypt to join Eighth Army in the North African Campaign.

After Eighth Army broke through the Axis positions at the Second Battle of El Alamein and began its pursuit across Libya, the AA units were leap-frogged forwards to cover the important objectives as they were taken. 1st AA Brigade moved up from Egypt to relieve 2nd AA Bde at Tobruk, then was in turn relieved by 17th AA Bde and moved on to Benghazi. As well as these ports, it was also involved in the defence of airfields for the supporting fighters and bombers of the Desert Air Force.

By January 1943, 1st AA Bde was deployed around Benghazi and Agedabia and at nearby landing grounds, with the following order of battle:
 51st (London) HAA Regiment
 152nd, 153rd, 242nd HAA Batteries – 24 x 3.7-inch guns
 69th (Royal Warwickshire Regiment) HAA Regiment
 192nd, 199th, 200th HAA Batteries – 24 x 3.7-inch guns
 135th Z Battery – 16 x rocket projectors
 89th (Cinque Ports) HAA Regiment– moving up to relieve 51st HAA Rgt – 24 x 3.7-inch guns
 2nd LAA Regiment
 6th, 155th LAA Batteries – 24 x Bofors guns
171 Battery from 57th LAA Rgt – 12 x Bofors guns
 390th S/L Battery – 12 x S/Ls
 37th (Tyne Electrical Engineers) LAA Regiment
 123rd, 124th, 222nd LAA Btys – 36 x Bofors guns
57th (King's Own Yorkshire Light Infantry) LAA Regiment – on loan from 4th Indian Division
 169th, 170th LAA Batteries – 24 x Bofors guns

When the North African Campaign ended in May 1943 with the Axis surrender in Tunisia, AA defence in the rear areas was under new headquarters. 1st AA Brigade – still at Benghazi and landing grounds – now came under AA Defence Area Cyrenaica, under No. 212 Group RAF. The brigade had the following composition:
 89th HAA Regiment
 28th HAA Bty, 9th HAA Regiment
 One Troop, 135th 'Z' Battery
 13th LAA Regiment
 96th LAA Regiment
 390th S/L Battery, detached from 27th London Electrical Engineers S/L Regiment
 Two AA Operations Rooms

As the war moved further away from North Africa, 1st AA Bde was redeployed back to the eastern end of the Mediterranean, so that by 1 January 1944 it was responsible for the Levant area, including Haifa, Homs and Baalbek, with the following composition:
 74th (City of Glasgow) HAA Regiment
 102nd HAA Regiment
 16th LAA Regiment
 37th LAA Regiment
 80th LAA Regiment
 390th S/L Battery

In June 1944 it was still in the Levant area, and had added Cyprus to its responsibilities, with the following composition:
 2nd HAA Regiment
 1st HAA Regiment, Hong Kong–Singapore Royal Artillery
 181st HAA Battery, 65th HAA Regiment
 257th HAA Battery, 83rd HAA Regiment
 37th LAA Regiment
 243rd Bty, 46th LAA Regiment
 1st Palestinian Independent LAA Battery
 219th Independent LAA Battery
 390th S/L Battery

Postwar
By 1947, 1 AA Bde had been reformed in 1 AA Group, which covered London and South East England, with the following composition:.
 30 LAA Regiment – converted to HAA September 1948; to British Army of the Rhine March 1951
 90 LAA Regiment – disbanded September 1948
 95 HAA Regiment – became 65 HAA Regiment September 1948
 1 & 9 Fire Control (FC) Troops

After Anti-Aircraft Command was disbanded on 10 March 1955, HQ 1 AA Bde was converted into a Territorial Army formation based at Edenbridge, Kent, and renumbered 30 AA Bde. That formation in turn was disbanded in 1961.

Notes

References
 Major L.F. Ellis, History of the Second World War, United Kingdom Military Series: The War in France and Flanders 1939–1940, London: HM Stationery Office, 1954/Uckfield, Naval & Military Press, 2004.
 Gen Sir Martin Farndale, History of the Royal Regiment of Artillery: The Years of Defeat: Europe and North Africa, 1939–1941, Woolwich: Royal Artillery Institution, 1988/London: Brasseys, 1996, .
 Norman E.H. Litchfield, The Territorial Artillery 1908–1988 (Their Lineage, Uniforms and Badges), Nottingham: Sherwood Press, 1992, .
 Maj-Gen I.S.O. Playfair & Brig C.J.C. Molony, "History of the Second World War, United Kingdom Military Series: The Mediterranean and Middle East, Vol IV: The Destruction of the Axis forces in Africa, London: HMSO, 1966/Uckfield, Naval & Military Press, 2004, 
 Brig N.W. Routledge, History of the Royal Regiment of Artillery: Anti-Aircraft Artillery 1914–55, London: Royal Artillery Institution/Brassey's, 1994, 
 J.B.M. Frederick, Lineage Book of British Land Forces 1660-1978'', Wakefield, Microform Academic Publishers, 1984, Volume 1 , 2 Volume set

External sources
 British Military History
 Patriot Files
 Royal Artillery 1939–1945
 British Army units from 1945 on
 Graham Watson, The Territorial Army 1947

Military units and formations established in 1920
1920 establishments in the United Kingdom
Air defence brigades of the British Army
Anti-Aircraft brigades of the British Army in World War II
Military units and formations disestablished in 1955